The Federation of Indian Communities of Queensland Inc. (FICQ) was founded in 1998.  It acts as a nonprofit umbrella body for organisations representing those with Indian heritage living Queensland, Australia. As of March 2023, it is consisted of 33 organisations. 

FICQ assists with the organising of the annual Diwali or Deepavali (Festival of Lights) staged in Brisbane's King George Square. This festival attracts people of diverse backgrounds and is supported by the Queensland Government and the Brisbane City Council.

FICQ Presidents include Shyam Das (2020 - current), Dr Ram Mohan (2018 - 2019) and Palani Thevar, J.P. (2016 - 2017).

Palani Thevar contested the state electorate of Maiwar as a candidate for the Australian Labor Party in the 2020 Queensland election.

Members Associations of FICQ
 http://www.hcindia-au.org/indian-association-in-queensland.htm
 http://tamilbrisbane.org.au
 http://qldteluguassociation.org/index.php
 http://tamilqld.org
 http://basavasamithibrisbane.org
 http://www.bsqonline.net.au
 https://brimm.org.au
 http://brisbanetelangana.org.au
 http://daminiwomens.com.au
 http://www.gaq.org.au/

References 

 http://www.hcindia-au.org/indian-association-in-queensland.htm
 https://www.communities.qld.gov.au/resources/multicultural/communities/qmrd-master-directory.pdf

External links
 http://www.ficq.org.au
 http://www.hcindia-au.org/indian-association-in-queensland.htm
 https://www.communities.qld.gov.au/resources/multicultural/communities/qmrd-master-directory.pdf
http://www.indiantimes.com.au

Organisations based in Queensland
Society in Queensland
Descent
Australian people of Indian descent
Australia–India relations